Fröndenberg station is a junction station on the Upper Ruhr Valley Railway and the Letmathe–Fröndenberg railway. It is in the German state of North Rhine-Westphalia between the Ruhr river to the south and the city of Fröndenberg to the northeast.

The station building has been closed and converted into a hotel for cyclists and a bicycle parking facility. Since 2009, Deutsche Post has erected a Packstation here. The ticket office has been replaced by a ticket machine. Previously there was a freight yard, part of which is now used for supermarket parking and the rest for station parking.

Services

The station is served by the following services, all at 60-minute intervals:

Notes

Railway stations in North Rhine-Westphalia
Railway stations in Germany opened in 1870
Buildings and structures in Unna (district)